Posyolok imeni Kirova is a rural locality (a settlement) in Bryzgalovskoye Rural Settlement, Kameshkovsky District, Vladimir Oblast, Russia. The population was 380 as of 2010. There are 5 streets.

Geography 
The village is located 8 km north-west from Posyolok imeni Karla Marksa, 14 km north from Kameshkovo.

References 

Rural localities in Kameshkovsky District